The Central Coast Pro Tennis Open is a tournament for professional female tennis players played on outdoor hardcourts. The event is classified as a $60,000 ITF Women's Circuit tournament and has been held in Templeton, United States, since 2017.

Past finals

Singles

Doubles

External links
 ITF search
 Official website

ITF Women's World Tennis Tour
Recurring sporting events established in 2017
Hard court tennis tournaments in the United States